Kosovo is administratively subdivided into districts (/ okruzi). They are further subdivided into municipalities (/ opština).

The entities were created by UNMIK.

See also 
 Districts of Kosovo
 Municipalities of Kosovo
 Cities and towns in Kosovo
 Populated places in Kosovo
 Populated places in Kosovo by Albanian name

References

Notes 

 
Kosovo